This is a list of Italian football transfers for the 2011–12 season. Only moves from Serie A and Serie B are listed. The summer transfer window would run from 1 July 2011, the end of the 2010–11 season, with a few transfers taking place prior to the season's complete end.

Summer transfer windows

July

August

Clubs in Italic means the players had spent on loan at season.

Date unknown

Out of window transfers

References
general

specific

Italy (August)
Tran
2011